Lyudmil Nikolov (born 27 August 1984) is a Bulgarian football player, who plays for Brestnik 1948 as a defender. Nikolov is a right and central defender. 

Height - 1.86 m.
Weight - 84 kg.

Career 
His first club is a Maritsa Plovdiv. Between 2005 and 2008 he played for Spartak Plovdiv. Nikolov signed a 3-year deal with Lokomotiv Plovdiv after being released from Spartak Plovdiv in 2008. In his first season in Lokomotiv, Nikolov earned 12 appearances playing in the A PFG.

External links 
  Lokomotiv Plovdiv profile

1984 births
Living people
Bulgarian footballers
First Professional Football League (Bulgaria) players
FC Spartak Plovdiv players
PFC Lokomotiv Plovdiv players
FC Sportist Svoge players

Association football defenders